This is a list of former Finnish military units.

Pre-independence

Wartime formations

Finnish Civil War 

 White Guard (Finland)
 Red Guards (Finland)

Winter War

Army of the Isthmus
 I Corps 
1st Division 
2nd Division (former 11th Division)
 II Corps
1st Division
4th Division
5th Division
6th Division - attached on 19 December
11th Division
23rd Division - arrived in February 1940

Others
 III Corps
8th Division
10th Division (later the 7th Division)
 IV Corps
 12th Division  
 13th Division 
 Separate Battalion 8 
 Separate Battalion 9 
 Separate Bicycle Company 4
 Swedish Volunteer Corps – Svenska Frivilligkåren, arrived in 1940
Lapland Group
North Finland Group
North Karelian Group

Continuation War

Armies 

 Army of Karelia

Corps
 I Corps
 II Corps
 III Corps
 IV Corps
 V Corps
 VI Corps
 VII Corps

Divisions
 1st Division
 2nd Division
 3rd Division
 4th Division
 5th Division
 6th Division – formed the 12th Brigade in 1942, reformed as 6th Division in 1943
 7th Division
 8th Division
 10th Division
 11th Division
 12th Division – formed 3rd Brigade in 1941
 14th Division
 15th Division
 17th Division
 18th Division
 19th Division – disbanded in 1942
 Armoured Division – formed in 1942
 Division J – formed in August 1941, disbanded in August 1942
 1st Coast Division – a Naval Forces unit, formed in July 1944''

Peacetime units

Army

Navy

Air Force

See also 

 List of military units in Finnish Defense Forces

References 

Lists of military units and formations of Finland
Military history of Finland